The Komyshna is a river in the Rostov Oblast of Russia and the Luhansk Oblast of Ukraine, and a right tributary of the Polnaya (Povna).

It has a length of 95 km, and its drainage basin covers 1205 square kilometers.

References

Rivers of Luhansk Oblast
Rivers of Rostov Oblast